George Bethune may refer to:

 George Bethune (gridiron football) (born 1967), former American football player
 George Henry Bethune (1878–1965), farmer and political figure in Ontario
 George Washington Bethune (1805–1862), preacher-pastor in the Dutch Reformed Church
 George Maximilian Bethune (1854–1942), English cricketer
 George Bethune (c1635-), Scottish politician